In mathematics, an H-space is a homotopy-theoretic version of a generalization of the notion of topological group, in which the axioms on associativity and inverses are removed.

Definition
This may be thought of as a pointed topological space together with a continuous multiplication for which the basepoint is an identity element up to basepoint-preserving homotopy.

One says that a topological space  is an H-space if there exists  and  such that the triple  is an H-space as in the above definition. Alternatively, an H-space may be defined without requiring homotopies to fix the basepoint , or by requiring  to be an exact identity, without any consideration of homotopy. In the case of a CW complex, all three of these definitions are in fact equivalent.

Examples and properties
The standard definition of the fundamental group, together with the fact that it is a group, can be rephrased as saying that the loop space of a pointed topological space has the structure of an H-group, as equipped with the standard operations of concatenation and inversion. Furthermore a continuous basepoint preserving map of pointed topological space induces a H-homomorphism of the corresponding loop spaces; this reflects the group homomorphism on fundamental groups induced by a continuous map.

It is straightforward to verify that, given a pointed homotopy equivalence from a H-space to a pointed topological space, there is a natural H-space structure on the latter space. As such, the existence of an H-space structure on a given space is only dependent on pointed homotopy type.

The multiplicative structure of an H-space adds structure to its homology and cohomology groups.  For example, the cohomology ring of a path-connected H-space with finitely generated and free cohomology groups is a Hopf algebra.  Also, one can define the Pontryagin product on the homology groups of an H-space.

The fundamental group of an H-space is abelian.  To see this, let X be an H-space with identity e and let f and g be loops at e.  Define a map F: [0,1] × [0,1] → X by F(a,b) = f(a)g(b).  Then F(a,0) = F(a,1) = f(a)e is homotopic to f, and F(0,b) = F(1,b) = eg(b) is homotopic to g.  It is clear how to define a homotopy from [f][g] to [g][f].

Adams' Hopf invariant one theorem, named after Frank Adams, states that S0, S1, S3, S7 are the only spheres that are H-spaces. Each of these spaces forms an H-space by viewing it as the subset of norm-one elements of the reals, complexes, quaternions, and octonions, respectively, and using the multiplication operations from these algebras. In fact, S0, S1, and S3 are groups (Lie groups) with these multiplications. But S7 is not a group in this way because octonion multiplication is not associative, nor can it be given any other continuous multiplication for which it is a group.

See also
Topological group
Čech cohomology
Hopf algebra
Topological monoid
H-object

Notes

References
.  Section 3.C

.
 .

Homotopy theory
Algebraic topology
Hopf algebras